North West is one of the nine multi-member constituencies of the National Assembly of South Africa, the lower house of the Parliament of South Africa, the national legislature of South Africa. The constituency was established in 1994 when the National Assembly was established by the Interim Constitution following the end of Apartheid. It is conterminous with the province of North West. The constituency currently elects 13 of the 400 members of the National Assembly using the closed party-list proportional representation electoral system. At the 2019 general election it had 1,702,728 registered electors.

Electoral system
North West currently elects 13 of the 400 members of the National Assembly using the closed party-list proportional representation electoral system. Constituency seats are allocated using the largest remainder method with a Droop quota.

Election results

Summary

Detailed

2019
Results of the 2019 general election held on 8 May 2019:

The following candidates were elected:
Nombuyiselo Adoons (ANC), Godrich Gardee (EFF), Sibusiso Kula (ANC), Tidimalo Legwase (ANC), Jane Manganye (ANC), Philemon Mapulane (ANC), Leigh-Ann Mathys (EFF), Ezekiel Molala (ANC), Asnath Molekwa (ANC), Itiseng Morolong (ANC), Cheryl Phillips (DA), Isaac Seitlholo (DA) and Bridgette Tlhomelang (ANC).

2014
Results of the 2014 general election held on 7 May 2014:

The following candidates were elected:
Hellen BoikHutso Kekana (ANC), Mapule Veronica Mafolo (ANC), Johanna Mmule Maluleke (ANC), Mohlopi Philemon Mapulane (ANC), Abinaar Modikela Matlhoko (EFF), Samuel Gaaesi Mmusi (ANC), Nthibane Rebecca Mokoto (ANC), Itumeleng Mosala (ANC), Abram Molefe Mudau (ANC), Girly Namhla Nobanda (ANC), Winston Rabotapi (DA), Primrose Sonti (EFF) and Johanna Steenkamp (DA).

2009
Results of the 2009 general election held on 22 April 2009:

The following candidates were elected:
Ipuseng Ditshetelo (UCDP), George Lekgetho (ANC), Mapule Veronica Mafolo (ANC), Johanna Mmule Maluleke (ANC), Jane Manganye (ANC), Daniel Kabelo Mataboge (ANC), Samuel Gaaesi Mmusi (ANC), Paul Bushy Mnguni (COPE), Wendy Nelson (ANC), Molefi Sefularo (ANC), Morwesi Johannah Segale-Diswai (ANC), Gaolaolwe Joseph Selau (ANC), Juanita Terblanche (DA) and Sussana Tsebe (ANC).

2004
Results of the 2004 general election held on 14 April 2004:

The following candidates were elected:
Tuelo Gibson Anthony (ANC), Kgomotso Paul Ditshetelo (UCDP), Thamsanqa Simon Dodovu (ANC), Onewang Rebecca Kasienyane (ANC), Kgotso Moses Khumalo (ANC), Samuel Kolman Louw (ANC), Makatse Sophia Maine (ANC), Mamosoeu Wendy Makgate (ANC), Lorna Maloney (ANC), Patrick Dumile Nono Maloyi (ANC), Monako Stephen Moatshe (ANC), Nthibane Rebecca Mokoto (ANC), Christopher Thabo Molefe (ANC), Solomon Mandlenkosi Rasmeni (ANC), Windvoel Milomabo Skhosana (ANC), Enver Surty (ANC) and Paul Stephanus Swart (DA).

1999
Results of the 1999 general election held on 2 June 1999:

1994
Results of the 1994 general election held on between 26 and 29 April 1994:

References

National Assembly of South Africa constituencies
National Assembly of South Africa constituencies established in 1994
National Assembly constituency